Uvariodendron gorgonis is a species of flowering plant in the family Annonaceae. It is native to Kenya and Tanzania. It is a tree that grows in various forests alongside Cola pseudoclavata, Lannea welwitschii, Diospyros kabuyeana, and  Combretum schumannii. It is threatened by habitat loss as forests are cleared and degraded by agriculture.

References

gorgonis
Flora of Kenya
Flora of Tanzania
Taxonomy articles created by Polbot